John Northrop may refer to:

 John Howard Northrop (1891–1987), biochemist
 John Isaiah Northrop (1861–1891), zoologist
 Jack Northrop (John Knudsen Northrop, 1895–1981), American aircraft industrialist and designer who founded the Northrop Corporation